Shikarpur is a village in Sonepur tehsil of Saran district in the Indian state of Bihar. Shikarpur's population is around 6973.

References

Villages in Saran district